The Indian tent turtle (Pangshura tentoria) is a species of turtle in the family Geoemydidae. The species is found in India, Nepal, and Bangladesh.

Description

Subspecies
Three subspecies of P. tentoria are recognized as being valid, including the nominotypical subspecies.
Pangshura tentoria tentoria 
Pangshura tentoria circumdata 
Pangshura tentoria flaviventer 

Nota bene: A trinomial authority in parentheses indicates that the subspecies was originally described in a genus other than Pangshura.

Geographic range
P. tentoria is found in Peninsular India, Nepal, and Bangladesh at elevations below  asl.
P. t. tentoria – Mahanadi and Godavari river drainages in India (country endemic)
P. t. circumdata – upper and central Ganges river drainage in India and southern Nepal
P. t. flaviventer – lower Ganges drainage in Bangladesh, India, and southern Nepal

Type locality: "in Indiae Orientalis regione Dukhun [=Deccan] dicta "; restricted by M.A. Smith 1931: 128, to "Dhond, Poona Dist.", India.

Habitat
P. tentoria is primarily a riverine turtle that occurs in both small and large rivers. They bask on rocks and tree snags. Females are largely herbivores while males and juveniles are more carnivorous.

Reproduction
P. tentoria is oviparous.

References

Further reading
Gray JE (1834). "Characters of several New Species of freshwater tortoises (Emys) from India and China". Proc. Zool. Soc. London 2: 53–55. (Emys tentoria, new species, p. 54). (in English and Latin).
Günther ACLG. (1864). The Reptiles of British India. London: The Ray Society. (Taylor and Francis, printers). xxvii + 452 pp. + Plates I-XXVI. (Pangshura tentoria, pp. 34–35 + Plate IV, figures C, C').
Smith MA (1931). The Fauna of British India, Including Ceylon and Burma. Reptilia and Amphibia. Vol. I.—Loricata, Testudines. London: Secretary of State for India in Council. (Taylor and Francis, printers). xxviii + 185 pp. + Plates I-II. (Kachuga tectum tentoria, pp. 128–129).

External links

http://www.chelonia.org/kachuga_gallery.htm

Pangshura
Turtles of Asia
Reptiles of Bangladesh
Reptiles of India
Reptiles of Nepal
Reptiles described in 1834
Taxa named by John Edward Gray